Charlie Brown and Charles Schulz is a documentary about the creator of the Peanuts series, Charles Schulz.

Background
Charlie Brown and Charles Schulz was first broadcast on the CBS television network on May 24, 1969. It features several different segments, including footage from the first Peanuts feature-length film, A Boy Named Charlie Brown, as well as portions of the unaired 1963 documentary of the same name.

Voice cast
 Peter Robbins as Charlie Brown
 Pamelyn Ferdin as Lucy van Pelt
 Glenn Gilger as Linus van Pelt
 Erin Sullivan as Sally Brown
 Bill Melendez as Snoopy

See also
 List of American films of 1969

References

External links
 

1969 films
American films with live action and animation
1960s American animated films
American documentary films
Peanuts television documentaries
1969 television specials
1969 in American television
1969 documentary films
1960s English-language films